
Year 144 BC was a year of the pre-Julian Roman calendar. At the time it was known as the Year of the Consulship of Galba and Cotta (or, less frequently, year 610 Ab urbe condita). The denomination 144 BC for this year has been used since the early medieval period, when the Anno Domini calendar era became the prevalent method in Europe for naming years.

Events 
 By place 
 Roman Republic 
 The Aqua Marcia aqueduct is built in Rome.

 Parthia 
 Parthians take Babylonia.

Births

Deaths 
 Liu Wu, Chinese prince of the Han Dynasty

References